Radew is a river of Poland, a tributary of the Parsęta in Karlino.

Rivers of Poland
Rivers of West Pomeranian Voivodeship